Journey to Silius, known in Japan as , is a side-scrolling run and gun video game developed and published by Sunsoft for the Nintendo Entertainment System in 1990.

Journey to Silius was originally based on the 1984 film The Terminator, but the licensing rights to the film were lost during development. The graphics and storyline were altered to accommodate this change.

Gameplay 

The player controls Jay McCray, as he goes on a mission to defeat the terrorist group responsible for his father's death. There are five stages, consisting of the ruins of a space colony, an underground concourse, the enemy's hideout, a flying spaceship, and a factory. The player must fight his way through an assortment of robotic enemies and security systems in order to reach the end of each stage and fight the stage's boss.

The controls follow the standard conventions of other side-scrolling action games for the NES. The character can lie down, but he can only aim his gun left or right. In addition to the default handgun weapon, the player can switch to one of five additional weapons that can be procured throughout the course of the game - which are a shotgun, a machine gun, a homing gun, a laser rifle, and a grenade launcher. Each of these special weapons consumes the player's Gun Energy gauge and once it runs out, the player would automatically revert to the default handgun. The player can replenish Jay's health and ammo by retrieving energy capsules dropped by defeated enemies. After the fifth and final stage is completed, the credits are shown, and the player would restart the game on the first stage.

Plot 
In the year 373 of the new space age calendar, overpopulation of Earth has led to increased demand for emigration to space colonies. Jay McCray, the son of a scientist responsible for development of space colony #428 in the Silius Solar System (SSS), prepares to move there in order to follow in his father's footsteps. However, the space station is obliterated in an explosion, killing the entire research team and destroying all data on board.

In his father's home, Jay discovers a floppy disk containing not only the complete SSS colony plans but a personal message from his father asking that he complete the projects should terrorists succeed in destroying the colony. To protect the colony plans and to avenge his father's death, Jay sets out to fight the terrorists responsible for the space colony's destruction.

Development 
Journey to Silius was originally conceived as a game based on the 1984 film The Terminator. However, Sunsoft lost the license during development and as a result the plot and graphics were altered before release.

The American version features a different design for the player character from the one used in the Japanese and European versions (which depict the main character in a futuristic armor and helmet, instead of having his head exposed). A pre-release build of the Japanese version, simply titled Rough, featured the same player character design used for the retail release of the American version.

The soundtrack was composed by Naoki Kodaka. Most NES composers would use the digital channel for sampled drums and the other channels for melodic content, but for Journey to Silius, Kodaka, with the programming assistance of Nobuyuki Hara, Shinichi Seya, and Naohisa Morota used the digital channel for a sampled bassline, and the triangle channel for a kick drum.

Ports 
Rough World was re-released in Japan in a two-in-one compilation for the PlayStation titled Memorial Series: Sunsoft Vol. 5, which also included Hebereke. On December 12, 2019, the game was ported to the Nintendo Switch for Nintendo Switch Online subscribers.

Reception 

While the game itself never received wide acclaim in Western markets, the music has been widely praised and has been subject of numerous remixes, such as the video game music website OverClocked ReMix's "JURN3Y 2 51L1U5" project.

Notes

References

External links 
 Memorial * Series: Sunsoft Vol. 5 Official Website
 

1990 video games
Nintendo Entertainment System games
Post-apocalyptic video games
Run and gun games
Sunsoft games
Video games about terrorism
Video games developed in Japan
Video games scored by Naoki Kodaka
Single-player video games
Nintendo Switch Online games